Persitara Jakarta Utara or just Persitara is an Indonesian football club based in North Jakarta (Utara means North). Currently, Persitara plays in the Liga 3. The club's home base are the Tugu Stadium.

History

The history of the establishment of Persitara itself cannot be separated from the role of Persija Jakarta as the parent of Jakarta football. In the 1970s, Persija, which was still affiliated with the West Java PSSI Regional Commission, initiated the establishment of a separate Regional Commission in Jakarta. The reason is, Persija which is the parent club has difficulty accommodating quite a lot of local clubs.

The formation of the Jakarta Regional Commission coincided with the establishment of other clubs, namely Persijatimut (East-North) and Persijaselbar (South-West). Persijatimut broke up and Persitara officially stood alone under the name of the North Jakarta Indonesian Football Association in 1985.

Persitara Jakarta Utara is a football club in Jakarta. Persitara is an acronym for the North Jakarta Indonesian Football Association. Initially the club nicknamed Laskar Si Pitung was founded in 1979 using the name Persija East-North and only later in 1985, the club officially used the name "Persitara North Jakarta", which is considered to truly represent the people of North Jakarta.

In the Perserikatan era, Persitara's best performance occurred in the 1985–86 season, when he successfully penetrated the Perserikatan One Division. Similar to other teams from Jakarta, Persitara lives from the support of APBD funds DKI Jakarta. It's just that, since its establishment, Persitara has not received the same disbursement of public funds as its older brother, Persija Jakarta.

The peak was when Sutiyoso held the leadership in DKI Jakarta for two terms. Persitara are not taken into account at all and are only considered as a complementary team. Especially with the emergence of the discourse "Jakarta Satu". That is, only one football team that appears to represent Jakarta. This can be seen from the APBD funds obtained. Persija received APBD funds of around Rp. 22 billion, while Persitara only got Rp. 3 billion.

Never getting the attention of DKI Provincial Government, Persitara's achievements were in free fall, to be in the lowest caste Second Division in the season 2002. From there, the team that has been accepted as a member of PSSI since 1980 has begun to make achievements, until finally being able to penetrate the Superliga, which this time was the second season held.

The most tragic of course is Persijatim East Jakarta, which is a splinter from Persitara. Due to the lack of attention in the capital city, the team was eventually sold to the provincial government of South Sumatra, which later changed its name to Sriwijaya FC.

The dualism that occurred in the Indonesian competition in 2011-2012, between the Indonesia Premier League which is managed by PT Liga Prima Indonesia Sportindo, owned by PSSI and PT Liga Indonesia, the operator of the Indonesia Super League, is increasingly tapering.

The 2010s were a difficult time for Persitara. The dualism of the competition in 2011-2013 with Batavia Union split the club apart. In addition, the acute financial crisis that undermined the Laskar Si Pitung began to show its effects. In the 2014 Premier Division, Persitara was in arrears on player salaries. They couldn't even afford to rent Tugu Stadium so they failed to hold a home game. Persitara were then relegated to Third Division.

The situation is getting chaotic for Persitara. The absence of competent management leaves them adrift in Third Division.

Logo history

Notable former players

  Alfredo Figueroa
  Armand Joel Banaken Bassoken
  Ladislas Kikunda Bushiri
  Javier Roca
  Hisanori Takada
  Oktavianus Maniani
  Kurniawan Dwi Yulianto
  Rahmat Rivai
  Supra Lestusen
  Vali Khorsandipish
  Afshin Parsaeian Rad
  Esaiah Pello Benson
  John Tarkpor Sonkaley
  Kabir Bello
  Ernesto Brunhoso
  Lamin Conteh
  Itimi Dickson
  Kim Jong-Kyung

References

External links
 

 
Football clubs in Indonesia
Football clubs in Jakarta
Association football clubs established in 1975
1975 establishments in Indonesia